Rebelové (international title: Rebels) is a 2001 Czech musical film.

Plot
The story, set in 1968, the year of the Prague Spring and the Soviet invasion, features a planned escape to the West and the arrest of one of its central characters for desertion from the army. The main couple, Tereza and Šimon, struggles to enjoy the free spirit of the times in spite of the turbulent political circumstances.

Production
The musical, written by Filip Renč and Zdeněk Zelenka, was first produced as a film in 2001. The cast included Zuzana Norisová (as Tereza), Jan Révai (as Šimon) and Tomáš Hanák (as Tereza's father).
Tereza .... Zuzana Norisová
Šimon .... Jan Révai
Julča .... Anna Veselá
Bugyna .... Alžbeta Stanková
Tereza's Dad .... Tomáš Hanák
Olda .... Martin Kubačák
Eman .... Ľuboš Kostelný
Bob .... Jaromír Nosek
Priest .... František Němec
Alžběta .... Soňa Norisová
Tuřín .... Ondřej Šípek
Drmola .... Petr Burian
Douša, Guard in Train .... Stanislav Štepka
teacher Drtinová .... Helga Čočková
Alžběta's husband .... Josef Carda
Major .... Bronislav Poloczek
Professor .... Jiřina Bohdalová
Male Singer .... Marcel Švidrman
Female Singer .... Kateřina Mátlová
Owner of Shooting Range .... Radana Herrmanová
Shoe Shopkeeper .... Jan Bursa
Principal .... Oto Ševčík
1st Officer of SNB (State National Safety) .... Jindřich Hrdý
2nd Officer of SNB .... Vít Pešina
Frontier Guard .... Jan Svěrák
Child .... Oskar Helcl
Child .... Valerie Šámalová
TV Editor .... Libuše Štědrá
Soviet Soldier .... Miroslav Bučkovský
Trombonist .... Ladislav Beran

Stage version
Norisová, in alternation with Zdenka Trvalcová and Zuzana Vejvodová, also appeared in a stage version, that opened at Prague's Broadway Theatre in September 2003. The role of Šimon was alternated by Zbyněk Fric, Martin Písařík and Ján Slezák.

Soundtrack 
The soundtrack was released by Supraphon. It is the highest selling soundtrack album ever in the Czech Republic, as well as the second best selling album in the country between 1994 and 2006. The album is also the highest-selling album in the country in 2001 with 120,000 copies sold.

 Měsíc
 Gina
 Pátá (Down Town)
 Jezdím bez nehod
 Jo, třešně zrály (Jailer, Bring Me the Water)
 Letíme na měsíc
 Š Š Š (Sugar Town)
 Včera neděle byla
 Oliver Twist
 Nej, Nej, Nej
 Mě se líbí Bob (My Boy Lollipop)
 Hvězda na vrbě
 Náhrobní kámen
 Já budu chodit po špičkách
 Stín katedrál
 San Francisco
 Řekni, kdy ty kytky jsou (Where Have All the Flowers Gone)

See also
 2001 in film

References

External links 

2001 films
2000s romantic musical films
2001 romantic comedy films
Czech musical films
2000s Czech-language films
Films set in 1968
Romantic musical films
Czech Lion Awards winners (films)
2000s Czech films